Chaos is a 2001 French comedy-drama film written and directed by Coline Serreau.

A remake of this movie in English, to star Miss Universe 1994 Sushmita Sen, Clint Eastwood, and Barbra Streisand, is planned by 2021. It was replaced by Aishwarya Rai and Meryl Streep.

Plot 

Paul and Hélène, a wealthy Parisian couple, are preparing to go out for the evening. While driving, they see three men chasing a prostitute down the street. She begs them to save her by letting her into the car, but Paul locks the doors and drives away as the three men savagely beat her, leaving her unconscious in the street. He refuses to let Hélène phone an ambulance, afraid of being charged with not helping a person in danger (which is a crime in France).

Hélène cannot forget the incident, and the next day she goes to the hospital, where she finds the prostitute, Noémie, in a coma. Moved, Hélène stops work and leaves her family responsibilities to stay with Noémie throughout her recovery, aiding her as she regains mobility and helping her to communicate since she can't yet speak. When one of the pimps returns to threaten and beat Noémie again into submission, Hélène follows him out of the hospital, knocks him unconscious with a wooden plank, and leaves him for the police to find.

Meanwhile, Paul and Hélène's son Fabrice, a university student, is cheating on his girlfriend with another girl, who is pregnant. When his girlfriend discovers the truth, she destroys his apartment. He moves into Paul's apartment just as Hélène moves out, and the two girls follow him, much to Paul's chagrin.

When Hélène returns home for a day, one of Noémie's pimps goes to the hospital with a friend and removes Noémie under the pretense that they are relatives taking her for a walk.  Noémie, who still cannot speak, is unable to protest.  Realising what has happened, Hélène follows them, accosts the pimps on the street, and takes Noémie to Paul's mother's house.  There, Noémie recovers her ability to talk, and explains her life story:

Her name is actually Malika, and she is a child of poor French-Algerian immigrants. At 17, her father attempted to sell her into an arrange marriage and she fled. She was picked up by a pimp, named Touki, on the street and he subsequently sold her into sexual slavery and had her hooked on heroin. She convinced Touki to move to Paris to speak to her step-mother and retrieve her passport. Her family kicked her out, and she formed plans to leave her life of forced prostitution behind. She sobered up and opened up an account with her sister, Zora's passport to put some money behind. She tried going to SOS Racisme for help, but she was dismissed. She moved to Geneva and seduced a rich man and conned him into giving her all of his money and jewelry, just before he died. She and Touki returned to Paris with the money. However, the rich man's family went to the press with claims that their money was stolen from the bank. Her pimps found out that she laundered the money for herself and beat her into signing a proxy. She escaped, with Touki and the other two pimps chasing after her, which was when Hélène and her husband came across her in their car at the beginning.

The two women plan Malika's freedom and revenge on her abusers. Hélène tells Malika that her husband was the one who locked the doors of their car during her attack, but Malika doesn't care. Later, she manages to distract Paul at the Basel airport, who looking for his Hélène, and has sex with him. All three manage to get on the same flight back to Paris, with Malika keeping her distance, in order to avoid the police.  Hélène finally stands up to the selfishness of her husband and son. Paul falls madly in love with Malika, going insane when she doesn't call. Fabrice also meets and falls in love with her.

Hélène and Malika set up the pimps and their gang to be arrested by the police. Touki is shot after trying to escape. Malika returns to her estranged family and tells her sister, Zora, that she will be forced into marriage as soon as she's old enough, just as Malika was at her age. To save her from a life of patriarchal misery, she begs her sister to come with her to live in freedom, but she refuses, saying she loves them.

Malika meets up with Paul again and she takes him to his mother's house. When Zora is beaten by her sexist brothers, her father reveals that she will indeed be married to an older man soon. Malika and Hélène rush to Marseilles and stop Malika's father from sending Zora off to a forced marriage. Her father curses her and she replies that it is the first time he has ever given her anything. The film ends with Malika, Hélène, Zora and Paul's mother sitting on a bench gazing at the sun.

Cast
 Vincent Lindon as Paul
 Catherine Frot as Hélène
 Rachida Brakni as Noémie/Malika
 Line Renaud as Mamie, Paul's mother
 Aurélien Wiik as Fabrice, son of Hélène and Paul
 Ivan Franek as Touki
 Michel Lagueyrie as Marsat
 Wojciech Pszoniak as Pali (as Wojtek Pszoniak)
 Éric Poulain as The young policeman
 Omar-Echériff Attalah as Tarek
 Hajar Nouma as Zora
 Chloé Lambert as Florence
 Marie Denarnaud as Charlotte
 Jean-Marc Stehlé as Blanchet
 Léa Drucker as Nicole
 Valérie Benguigui as The Medecin

Awards and honors
 César Award for Most Promising Actress (Rachida Brakni) and nominations for Best Film, Best Writing, Best Actress, and Best Actress in a Supporting Role (Line Renaud) in 2002.
 Lumière prize for Most Promising Actress (Rachida Brakni) in 2002.
 People's Choice and Critic's Choice at the Norwegian International Film Festival 2002.

Reception 
On review aggregation website Rotten Tomatoes, the film has an approval rating of 85% based on 52 reviews. Review aggregator Metacritic gave the film a score of 81 out of 100 based on 15 critics, indicating "universal acclaim". Stephen Holden of The New York Times described the film as "gripping feminist fable with a savage comic edge".

References

External links
 
 
New York Times review

2001 films
2001 comedy-drama films
French comedy-drama films
French satirical films
2000s French-language films
2000s feminist films
Films about prostitution in Paris
Films set in Paris
Films set in Marseille
Films directed by Coline Serreau
Films produced by Alain Sarde
2000s satirical films
2000s French films